This is a list of lakes of New Brunswick, a province of Canada.

List of lakes

References

New Brunswick
Lakes